Nurabad Rural District is a rural district (dehestan) in the Central District of Manujan County, Kerman Province, Iran. At the 2006 census, its population was 2,508, in 642 families. The rural district has 14 villages.

References 

Rural Districts of Kerman Province
Manujan County